Paolo Benigno "Bam" Aguirre Aquino IV (born May 7, 1977) is a Filipino politician and social entrepreneur who served as a Senator of the Philippines from 2013 to 2019. He is a member of the prominent Aquino family in the Philippines.

Pre-politics activities
Aquino was also one of the hosts of the morning TV show Breakfast, a youth-oriented talk show at Studio 23. In 2006, Aquino hosted the youth-oriented debate show Y Speak in Studio 23 (now ABS-CBN Sports & Action Ch. 23).

In 2009, Aquino played the role of his uncle Ninoy Aquino, in the documentary film, The Last Journey of Ninoy. The film premiered on August 21, 2009, in commemoration of the 26th anniversary of the assassination of Ninoy. It was directed by Jun Reyes.

Before becoming a senator, Aquino became the President of MicroVentures, Inc., a social enterprise company that manages the Hapinoy Program which provides micro-financing, training and access to new business opportunities for women micro-entrepreneurs. For his efforts, Aquino was named as one of the Ten Outstanding Young Men of the Philippines in the category of Social Enterprise and Community Development. He was also chosen as one of the Ten Outstanding Young Persons of the World in 2012.

He was also a Board Member of Rags2Riches, Venture for Fundraising, and the Coca-Cola Foundation.

Political career

2013 senatorial bid 
Running under the Team PNoy coalition of his cousin, he won in the 2013 elections and placed 7th with 15,388,992 votes.

16th and 17th Congress
Aquino chaired the Committee on Science and Technology from 2016 to 2019. He was also a member of the following committees:

 Committee on Accountability of Public Officers and Investigations (Blue Ribbon)
 Committee on Agriculture and Food
 Committee on Banks, Financial Institutions and Currencies
 Committee on Civil Service and Government Reorganization
 Committee on Cooperatives
 Committee on Cultural Communities
 Committee on Education, Arts and Culture
 Committee on Energy
 Committee on Environment and Natural Resources
 Committee on Games, Amusement and Sports
 Committee on Health and Demography
 Committee on Local Government
 Committee on National Defense and Security
 Committee on Peace, Unification and Reconciliation
 Committee on Public Information and Mass Media
 Committee on Rules
 Committee on Science and Technology
 Committee on Social Justice, Welfare, and Rural Development
 Committee on Ways and Means
 Senate Electoral Tribunal

He was the former chairman of the Committee on Education Culture and Arts from July 2016 until his removal from the position in February 2017 due to his opposition on a Duterte-backed legislation. He was chairman of the Committee on Trade, Commerce, and Entrepreneurship and Committee on Youth from July 2013 to June 2016.

Laws passed
Senator Aquino passed more than 40 laws during his first five and half years in office.

 Republic Act 10931, or the Universal Access to Quality Tertiary Education Act
 Republic Act 10929, or Free Internet Access in Public Space
 Republic Act 10693, or Microfinance NGOs Act
 Republic Act 10911, or Anti Age-Discrimination Act
 Republic Act 10821, or Children's Emergency Relief and Protection Act
 Republic Act 10863, or the Customs Modernization and Tariff Act (CMTA)
 Republic Act 10909, or No Shortchanging Act
 Republic Act 10644, or the Go Negosyo Act
 Republic Act 10642, or the Philippine Lemon Law
 Republic Act 10667, or the Philippine Competition Act
 Republic Act 10668, or the Foreign Ships Co-Loading Act
 Republic Act 10679, or the Youth Entrepreneurship Act
 Under Republic Act No. 10742, or the Sangguniang Kabataan Reform Act
 Republic Act No. 10693, or the Microfinance NGOs Act
 Republic Act No. 10744, or the Credit Surety Fund Act of 2014
 Republic Act No. 10756, or the Election Service Reform Act of 2014
 Republic Act 10755, or the Act Authorizing The Punong Barangay to Administer the Oath of Office
 Republic Act No. 10844, or the Department of Information and Communication Technology Act of 2015
 Republic Act No. 10754, or the Act Expanding the Benefits and Privileges of Persons with Disability
 Republic Act 10905, or Closed Caption Broadcasting of Television Programs Act
 Republic Act 11054, or the Bangsamoro Organic Law
 Republic Act No. 11106, or the Filipino Sign Language Act

 2019 re-election bid 
Aquino ran for re-election as senator as one of the Otso Diretso candidates. He failed to win in his re-election bid, placing 14th overall with 14,144,923 votes. Aquino was quoted that "There are 14 million people who voted for an Aquino during the time of Duterte. That's something". According to his wife, he might return to his social entrepreneurship initiatives after his term ended on June 30, 2019.

On July 19, 2019, the PNP–Criminal Investigation and Detection Group (CIDG) filed charges against Aquino and other members of the opposition for "sedition, cyber libel, libel, estafa, harboring a criminal, and obstruction of justice". On February 10, 2020, he was cleared of all charges.

 Campaign manager of Leni Robredo 
Aquino initially planned to run for senator in the 2022 Philippine Senate election. However, on October 7, 2021, he revealed that Vice President Leni Robredo had offered him the role of campaign manager for her presidential campaign in the 2022 Philippine presidential election, which she launched earlier that day. Aquino accepted the offer and did not file his certificate of candidacy for a Senate bid to focus on "this essential and daunting challenge."

 Personal life 

Bam Aquino was born on May 7, 1977, in Manila. He is the son of Paul Aquino, a son of Benigno Aquino Sr., and Melanie (née Aguirre) Aquino.

His grandfather, Benigno Sr., served as a congressman from Tarlac's 2nd District (1919–28), a senator from the 3rd District (1928–34) Speaker of the National Assembly of the Japanese-puppet state of the Philippines from 1943 to 1944. Went on trial for Treason after the world war II for collaborating with the Japanese, and eventually became the 6th Speaker of the House of Representatives of the Philippines (1943–44).

Under President Ferdinand Marcos' regime, his uncle Benigno "Ninoy" Aquino Jr., a former senator (1967–72), was exiled in the United States from 1980 until 1983 when he returned to the Philippines and was assassinated at Manila International Airport.

In 1986, Marcos fled into exile and Ninoy's wife, Corazon Aquino, became the first female President of the Philippines. His uncle Butz and aunt Teresa also served as senators. His cousin, Benigno Aquino III, was elected the 15th President of the Philippines in 2010, which he served until 2016.
He is married to Maria Fatima  Gomez. They have two daughters.

References

External links
 
 Rags2Riches (Accessed on February 25, 2017)
 Arquiza, Yasmin D. “In new Cory-Ninoy docu: A lesson in letting go”. GMA News Online. (Accessed on October 23, 2012)
 Legaspi, Amita. “Bam Aquino files COC for senator, says he won't be lapdog of cousin PNoy”. GMA News Online. (Accessed on October 23, 2012)
 Sauler, Erika. “Bam Aquino: I can serve Philippines better as senator”. Inquirer News''. (Accessed on October 23, 2012)

1977 births
Living people
Bam Aquino
People from Manila
People from Tarlac
Ateneo de Manila University alumni
Filipino television personalities
Liberal Party (Philippines) politicians
Senators of the 16th Congress of the Philippines
Senators of the 17th Congress of the Philippines
Campaign managers